Hòa Bình is a district of Bạc Liêu province in the Mekong Delta region of Vietnam. It was established in 2007. The district's area is about 411.33 km2 and its population is about 102,063 people (2005).

Administrative divisions
Hòa Bình includes a township and seven communes:
Hòa Bình township
Minh Diệu
Vĩnh Bình
Vĩnh Mỹ A
Vĩnh Mỹ B
Vĩnh Thịnh
Vĩnh Hậu
Vĩnh Hậu A

Districts of Bạc Liêu province